Tezerj (also Romanized as Tez̄erj; also known as Tezerch) is a village in Rabor Rural District, in the Central District of Rabor County, Kerman Province, Iran. At the 2006 census, its population was 553, in 122 families.

References 

Populated places in Rabor County